The 1968 Campeonato Argentino de Rugby   was won by the selection of Buenos Aires that beat in the final the selection of  Rosario

That year in Argentina rugby union 
 The Buenos Aires Champsionship was won by Belgrano AC and C.U.B.A. 16
 The Cordoba Province Championship was won by Córdoba Athletic
 The North-East Championship was won by Universitario Tucumán
 The Argentine national team, beat for the first time the Wales. A victory and a draw per the "Pumas"

 In December 12, death at only 51 years the president of U.A.R., Juan C: Wells, that was in charge a president in 1961-62, 1962–63 and from 1965 to his death.

Knock on stages

Semifinals 

 Buenos Aires: A. Pagano, M. Walther, M. Pascual, C. Martínez, M. Lalanne, J. Dartilongue, A. Etchegaray, J. O'Reilly, E. Elowson, L. Loyola, R. Sellarés, A. Anthony, L. García Yáñez, C. Massabó, R. Casabal.
Valle de Lerma: = J. García Bes, R. Raccioppi, S. Pintos, E. Escribano, O. Dell'Acqua, H. Cornejo, A. Alderete, H. Flores, G. Smtih, M. Clement, F. Dacal, E. Clement, P. Ivona, E. Tangona, O. Giménez.

 Rosario: J. Seaton, A. Quetglas, J. Benzi, N. Ferrazza, R. Villavicencio, J. Scilabra, O. Aletta, J. L. Imhoff, M. Chesta, J. Imhoff, M. Senatore, H. Suárez, F. Landó, R. Seaton, F. Tricerri. 
Cordoba: |Formazione 2= L. Capell, H. Espinoza, M. Capell, E. Meta, R. Mulle, J. Vera, J. Del Valle, J. Baldaserre, R. Campra, P. Demo, J. Saine, M. Enríquez, C. Abud, J. Paz, G. Ribeca.

Third Place final

Final 

 Buenos Aires: A. Pagano, M. Walther, A. Rodríguez Jurado, M. Pascual, M. Queirolo, J. Dartilongue, A. Etchegaray, L. Loyola, H. Silva (cap.), J. O'Reilly, A. Anthony, R. Sellarés, R. Casabal, C. Massabó, L. García Yañéz. 
Rosario: J. Seaton, A. Quetglas, J. Benzi, C. Blanco, R. Villavicencio, J. Scilabra, O. Aletta, J. Imhoff, M. Chesta (cap.), J. L. Imhoff, M. Senatore, H. Suárez,  F. Tricerri, R. Seaton, F. Landó.

Bibliography 
  Memorias de la UAR 1968
  XXIV Campeonato Argentino

Campeonato Argentino de Rugby
Argentina
rugby